The 11th Annual Gotham Independent Film Awards, presented by the Independent Filmmaker Project, were held on October 1, 2001 and were hosted by Andy Dick. At the ceremony, Robert De Niro was honored with a Career Tribute, Edet Belzberg received the Anthony Radziwell Documentary Achievement Award and Uma Thurman was awarded the Actor Award. For the first and only time an Independent Vision Award was given out in memory of William J. Nisselson, longtime manager of the post-production studio Sound One Studios in New York who died in 2001 at the age of 56.

Winners and nominees

Breakthrough Actor
 Yolonda Ross – Stranger Inside

Breakthrough Director (Open Palm Award)
 Henry Bean – The Believer (TIE) 
 John Cameron Mitchell – Hedwig and the Angry Inch (TIE)
 Michael Cuesta – L.I.E.
 Daniel Minahan – Series 7: The Contenders
 Randy Redroad – The Doe Boy
 David Wain – Wet Hot American Summer

Anthony Radziwell Documentary Achievement Award
 Edet Belzberg for Children Underground

Actor Award
 Uma Thurman

Independent Vision Award
 In Memory of William J. Nisselson

Career Tribute
 Robert De Niro

References

External links
 

2001
2001 film awards